Bosko the Lumberjack is an American animated short film, released September 3, 1932, though one source gives only an ambiguous release date of 1931–1932. It is a Looney Tunes cartoon, featuring Bosko, the original star of the series. Like most Looney Tunes of its day, it was directed by Hugh Harman; its musical direction was by Frank Marsales.

Summary
Autumn leaves aflutter, lumberjacks ply their trade in a forest: a two-man saw is found to require the strength of only one man, as his compatriot, a mouse, hangs off his handle, swinging about, his legs too short to touch the earth; another pair of loggers make more typical use of their gear, except that, as each pulls the other in order to make the necessary movement of the saw, the other's trousers drop revealingly. A fresh log slinks away, up a slope, up to a platform, from whence it jumps off to a waiting transport. Having made the requisite cut through a tree trunk, another lumberjack, without felling his tree, strategically cuts its trunk such that twelve discrete little logs, roughly equal in length, are produced, each creative strike batting away another log such that the twelve form a neat pile off to the side, each making a tone of the chromatic scale as it falls, like the bars of a xylophone.

Here, a centipede-logger debarks a great tree as his many arms and axes swing one after the other at a great patch and here, we find a great, burly shadow hammering away at a stout and still adversary—and in the burgeoning light of the rising Sun, why should it not be little Bosko taking his hatchet to a sapling? Felled, the trunk struggles for dear life, reaching out its little boughs if only to grasp the empty air before it falls limp. And off whistles Bosko, here leaping over a log, here sliding along another young tree; he stops briefly to take his axe to the antlers of a moose, but is dissuaded from his course by the creature's protest. He happens on a tree; rubbing his hands & spitting in readiness, he swings his tool, disturbing thereby a skunk who lodges there: the angry tenant airs his grievance, first in word, then in deed:  he releases his noxious spray and thus ends Bosko's visit. Our hero runs off into a thin tree and sits in a daze for a moment as leaves fall gently about him; a woodpecker swoops in and pecks at the same tree and Bosko, recovering, sees the bird's usefulness to the logger: clutching his avian tool, Bosko fells a tree in record time and pats his little friend on the head for his service. Then, Honey calls; Bosko rushes over, excited to see her. She bears a basket bearing Bosko's lunch; delighted, he reaches in to claim a sandwich, which he noisily munches for the benefit of his sweetheart, who sways admiringly next to him. "Dat sho is fine!" he proclaims.

A great logger sits on a wooden girder above: he saws two slices off of a log and lays a handful of nails between them; this sandwich is his rugged luncheon, which he chews methodically, bite by bite, stopping to dislodge the occasional bad nail. Our hero and his sweetheart are swaying chastely next to each other when this same gourmet hungrily eyes Honey. Taking to a winch upon the girder, the villain lets out a rope whose end contains a hook, which same eagerly takes Honey by her skirt; winding up the rope, the villain has the terrified girl in his clutches. "By Gar," he growls, "now you give Pierre big kiss!" He menaces and she withdraws. Bosko cries out against this affront; mounting a ladder, he confronts his rival: "You cur!" he cries. The brute knocks him down the ladder with such force that Bosko's bottom dissevers the rungs as he passes effortlessly through them; hitting earth, Bosko bounces onto a log headed, unbeknown to him, for a circular saw, which begins to spin and take in the mechanically-conveyed log just as Bosko touches it. The saw's action scorches Bosko's poor rump and our hero leaps up, delaying only a moment to ease his pain.

Above, the villain pursues still his reluctant prey: Honey swings away on a cord which activates a steam whistle, whose exhaust blasts the glowering bully in the face. But Honey is trapped, dangling at the bottom of the cord, and her tormentor, now on firm ground, can simply reach up and grab her. Bosko spies this as the cur is fleeing; the cur, squeezing, as it seems, an inconveniently placed sapling tapped, apparently and strangely, for syrup-production, squirts Bosko's face with sap, delaying him momentarily.

A river runs through the forest. Now, the villain has Honey in a row boat; Bosko must settle for a hollow log by the bank, which, as it turns out, luckily, is manned by three mouse-rowers. "Stroke! Stroke!" he orders the crew by makeshift bullhorn. Before long, both reach land: the villain steals away to his little cabin, barely evading little Bosko. The brute blocks the door as Bosko bangs to demand entry; a moose's head mounted on the wall, its antlers bearing aloft a shotgun, we find able to use its antlers as arms as it dexterously fires a few rounds from the gun into the seat of Pierre's pants. The door freed, Bosko storms in, fists at the ready: the cad knocks Bosko away such that his little body strikes the four rafters of the house in quick succession; he slides along the floor, under the bed in the corner, emerging with a literal cracked crown. But our hero is in the fight yet; this time, the brute sends him flying through the stove and out through its network of pipes, sliding along the floor, under and into a bear pelt-rug which, thus donned, makes Bosko appear a live grizzly! He runs headlong into a wall and a bear trap as his enemy grinds his teeth in pursuit. On his guard, brandishing an axe, Bosko swings high and catches an unlucky barrel just behind him as the cur gets close; with all his strength, Bosko swings axe and barrel onto the villain's head. Dazed, bound by the compromised barrel's rungs, defeated, Pierre the amorous lumberjack falls. Our damsel-no-longer-in-distress proclaims Bosko her hero; she kisses him and he falls dizzily backwards into the wall, from whose height falls a portrait of Napoleon, whose head is pierced and thus replaced by Bosko's. "La Marseillaise" comes through as Honey proudly salutes her wide-grinning champion.

References

External links
  Bosko the Lumberjack on YouTube (unrestored)

Looney Tunes shorts
Warner Bros. Cartoons animated short films
1932 films
1932 animated films
Films directed by Hugh Harman
Films scored by Frank Marsales
Bosko films
American black-and-white films
1930s Warner Bros. animated short films